This is a list of Eastern Washington Eagles football players in the NFL Draft.

Key

Selections

References

Eastern Washington

Eastern Washington Eagles NFL Draft